The 1960 Detroit Titans football team represented the University of Detroit as an independent during the 1960 NCAA University Division football season. Detroit outscored its opponents by a combined total of 181 to 136 and finished with a 7–2 record in its second year under head coach Jim Miller.

After losing the season opener to Iowa State, the Titans won seven games in a row, including victories over Cincinnati (14-0), Boston College (19-17), Marquette (32-12), and Villanova (13-7). The season ended with a 43-15 loss to Michigan State in East Lansing.

The team's statistical leaders included Jerry Gross with 886 passing yards and 343 rushing yards, Steve Stonebreaker with 416 receiving yards, and Ted Karpowicz with 30 points scored.

Four players from the 1960 team, Steve Stonebreaker, Larry Vargo, Jim Shorter, and Frank Jackunas went on to play in the National Football League (NFL).  In 2001, the 1960 Titans football team was inducted as a group into the Detroit Titans Hall of Fame.

Schedule

Players
 Fred Abele, end, 180 pounds, 6-1, Detroit
 Billy Allen, halfback, 175 pounds, 5-10, Altoona, Pennsylvania
 Tony Asher, guard, 205 pounds, 5-10, Detroit
 Vic Battani, fullback, 205 pounds, 5-8, Detroit
 Jim Cain, tackle, 223 pounds, 6-4, Toronto, Ontario
 Paul Christ, guard, 190 pounds, 6-0, St. Louis, Missouri
 Tom DeLuca, fullback, 205 pounds, 5-9, Akron, Ohio
 Jerry Gross, quarterback, 168 pounds, 5-10, Bay City, Michigan
 Tony Hanley, quarterback, 153 pounds, 5-9, Sunnyvale, California
 Frank Jackunas, center, 215 pounds, 6-3, Baldwin, Michigan
 Ted Karpowicz, halfback, 185 pounds, 6-0, Hamtramck, Michigan
 Dave Loner, halfback, 185 pounds, 6-1/2, Southfield, Michigan
 Bob Lusky, quarterback, 185 pounds, 6-0, Tamaqua, Pennsylvania
 Tom Marshall, end, 190 pounds, 6-0, Lewes, Delaware
 Jim Post, halfback, 185 pounds, 5-10, Coldwater, Michigan
 Tom Shanahan, halfback, 170 pounds, 5-10, Chicago
 Jim Shorter, halfback, 172 pounds, 5-10, Pontiac, Michigan
 Steve Stonebreaker, end, 200 pounds, 6-3, Detroit
 Joe Trapp, tackle, 220 pounds, 6-2, Scardsdale, New York
 Larry Vargo, end 200 pounds, 6-3, Detroit

References

External links
 1960 University of Detroit football programs

Detroit
Detroit Titans football seasons
Detroit Titans football
Detroit Titans football